The Wisconsin Labor History Society (WLHS), founded in 1980, is a non-profit association, based in Milwaukee, to research and inform academics, workers, and general public on the labor history in the US state of Wisconsin.  It commemorates the Bay View Tragedy of May 5, 1886, when state militia opened fire and killed eight of 1,500 workers marching during a national strike for an 8-hour work-day.

Public sponsorship
WLHS sponsors the "Struggle for Justice" photo exhibit about farm workers' organizing in the 1960s in Wisconsin.

WLHS participates in a network of labor history organizations in the US and Canada including Illinois Labor History Society and the Pacific Northwest Labor History Association and holds joint meetings with them.

WLHS co-sponsors the Wisconsin Workers Memorial located in Zeidler Union Square Park in Milwaukee.

Publications
 Quarterly printed newsletter reports on events in labor history and WLHS activities
 Monthly online newsletter
 Books, curricula, videos and other materials on labor history

Conferences
WHLS sponsors an annual conference to highlight significant events in Wisconsin labor history.

WLHS co-sponsors an annual Bay View Tragedy commemoration to honor workers killed in 1886 march during a national strike for an eight-hour work-day.

Grants, awards
WLHS promotes labor studies in colleges and universities:
 Daitsman Awards:  special grants for labor history projects
 Zeidler Academic Award: annual award to graduate and undergraduate college students for original research into Wisconsin labor and working-class history

WLHS promotes labor studies in high and middle schools, including:* Labor History Essay Contest:  Offers cash awards to Wisconsin high school students
 National History Day Contest:  Sponsors awards for labor history projects by Wisconsin middle and high school students

Archives
WLHS has a strong relationship with the Wisconsin Historical Society (WHS), which regularly refers labor-related inquiries to WLHS and posts WHLS news and events.  WHS also maintains a labor collection.

The WLHS archive includes histories of local labor unions and councils, buttons and badges, photos, and meeting minutes.  As of 2018, WLHS acquired a project to map important Wisconsin labor sites.

See also
 Labor history of the United States
 Bay View Massacre
 Wisconsin Workers Memorial
 Illinois Labor History Society
 Labor and Working-Class History Association

References

External links
 Milwaukee 365
 Wisconsin Department of Public Instruction
 University of Wisconsin - Madison - School for Workers
 Wisconsin State AFL-CIO
 Milwaukee Area Labor Council CIO
 Wisconsin Laborers
 Wisconsin Historical Society

Organizations established in 1980
History organizations based in the United States
History of labor relations in the United States
Labor studies organizations
Working class in the United States